William Stein may refer to:
 William A. Stein (born 1974), computer programmer and mathematician
 William Howard Stein (1911–1980), biochemist
 Willie Stein (died 2009), television producer and songwriter
 Bill Stein (born 1947), American baseball player
 Bill Stein (American football) (1899–1983), American football offensive lineman

See also
 Randy Stein (William Randolph Stein, 1953–2011), baseball pitcher